Gary Burton (born January 23, 1943) is an American jazz vibraphonist, composer, and educator. Burton developed a pianistic style of four-mallet technique as an alternative to the prevailing two-mallet technique. This approach caused him to be heralded as an innovator, and his sound and technique are widely imitated. He is also known for pioneering fusion jazz and popularizing the duet format in jazz, as well as being a major figure in music education from his 30 years at the Berklee College of Music.

Biography
Burton was born in Anderson, Indiana, United States. Beginning music at six years old, he mostly taught himself to play marimba and vibraphone. He began studying piano at age sixteen while finishing high school at Princeton Community High School in Princeton, Indiana (1956–60). He has cited jazz pianist Bill Evans as the inspiration for his approach to the vibraphone.

Burton attended Berklee College of Music in Boston, Massachusetts, in 1960–61 and the Stan Kenton Clinic at Indiana University in 1960. He studied with Herb Pomeroy and soon befriended composer and arranger Michael Gibbs. After establishing his career during the 1960s, he returned to join the staff of Berklee from 1971–2004, serving first as professor, then dean, and executive vice president, during his last decade at the college. In 1989, Burton received an Honorary Doctorate of Music from Berklee.

Early in his career, at the behest of Nashville saxophonist Boots Randolph, Burton moved to Nashville, Tennessee and recorded with several musicians from the area, including guitarist Hank Garland, pianist Floyd Cramer and guitarist Chet Atkins.

Burton toured the U.S. and Japan with pianist George Shearing. Shearing asked Burton to write a whole album of compositions for him which were released as Out of the Woods in 1965. Burton described the album in his autobiography, Learning to Listen, as his "most ambitious effort at composing and arranging". Burton played with saxophonist Stan Getz from 1964 to 1966. It was during this time that he appeared with the band in the movie Get Yourself a College Girl, playing "Girl from Ipanema" with Astrud Gilberto. In 1967, he formed the Gary Burton Quartet with guitarist Larry Coryell, drummer Roy Haynes, and bassist Steve Swallow. Predating the jazz-rock fusion craze of the 1970s, the group's first album, Duster, combined jazz, country, and rock. However, some of Burton's previous albums (notably Tennessee Firebird and The Time Machine, both from 1966) had already shown his inclination toward such experimentation. After Coryell left the quartet in the late 1960s, Burton worked with guitarists Jerry Hahn, David Pritchard, Mick Goodrick, Pat Metheny, John Scofield, Wolfgang Muthspiel, Kurt Rosenwinkel, and Julian Lage.

Burton was named DownBeat magazine's Jazzman of the Year in 1968 (the youngest to receive that title) and won his first Grammy Award in 1972. The following year Burton began a forty-year collaboration with pianist Chick Corea, recognized for popularizing the format of jazz duet performance. Their eight albums won Grammy Awards in 1979, 1981, 1997, 1999, 2009, and 2013.

Burton has played with a wide variety of jazz musicians, including Gato Barbieri, Carla Bley, Chick Corea, Peter Erskine, Stan Getz, Hank Garland, Stephane Grappelli, Herbie Hancock, Keith Jarrett, B. B. King, Steve Lacy, Pat Metheny, Makoto Ozone, Tiger Okoshi, Astor Piazzolla, Tommy Smith, Ralph Towner, and Eberhard Weber.

Burton is known for his variation of traditional four-mallet grip which has come to be known as "Burton Grip," and is popular among jazz vibraphonists, as well as some concert marimbists, including Pius Cheung and Evelyn Glennie.

From 2004 to 2008, Burton hosted a weekly jazz radio show on Sirius Satellite Radio. In 2011, he released his first album for Mack Avenue Records, entitled Common Ground, featuring the New Gary Burton Quartet (with Julian Lage, Scott Colley, and Antonio Sanchez). In 2013, the group released Guided Tour, their second recording for Mack Avenue Records. Burton's autobiography, Learning to Listen, was published by Berklee Press in August 2013 and was voted "Jazz Book of the Year" by the Jazz Journalists Association.

Burton retired from performing in March 2017 following a farewell tour with pianist and longtime collaborator Makoto Ozone.

Personal life
By the 1980s, Burton was in a gay relationship, and he came out publicly in a 1994 radio interview with Terry Gross, making him one of the rather few openly gay jazz musicians of prominence. In 2013, he married Jonathan Chong in Provincetown, Massachusetts. Burton's current partner is Dustin Le.

Discography

As leader/co-leader

Compilations 
 Works (ECM, 1984)[LP]
 Collection (GRP, 1996)
 Take Another Look. A Career Retrospective (Mack Avenue, 2018)[5LP]

Collaborations 
 Live from the Detroit Jazz Festival – 2013 (Mack Avenue, 2014)
 Hommage a Eberhard Weber (ECM, 2015)

As sideman 
With Thomas Clausen
 Café Noir (Intermusic, 1991)
 Flowers and Trees (MA Music, 1992)

With Hank Garland
 After the Riot at Newport (RCA Victor, 1960) – released under the name The Nashville All-Stars
 Jazz Winds from a New Direction (Columbia, 1961) – also released as Hank Garland & Gary Burton's Three-Four The Blues (CBS, 1961)
 The Unforgettable Guitar of Hank Garland (Columbia, 1962)

With Stan Getz
 Getz Au Go Go (Verve, 1964)
 Nobody Else But Me (Verve, 1964)
 Getz/Gilberto No. 2 (Verve, 1966)
 The Stan Getz Quartet in Paris (Verve, 1967) – live
 The Canadian Concert of Stan Getz (Can-Am, 1983)

With George Shearing
 Jazz Concert (Capitol, 1963) – live
 Out of the Woods (Capitol, 1965)
 Rare Form! (Capitol, 1966) – live

With Eberhard Weber
 Fluid Rustle (ECM, 1979)
 Hommage à Eberhard Weber (ECM, 2015) – live

With others
 Chet Atkins, After the Riot at Newport with the Nashville Allstars (RCA, 1960)
 Bob Brookmeyer, Bob Brookmeyer and Friends (Columbia, 1965) – rec. 1964
 Eric Clapton, Journeyman (Reprise, 1989)
 Bruce Cockburn, The Charity of Night (True North, 1996)
 Floyd Cramer, Last Date (RCA Victor, 1960)
 Eddie Daniels, Benny Rides Again (GRP, 1992)
 Tim Hardin, Tim Hardin 1 (Verve, 1966) - rec. 1964-65
 Quincy Jones, Quincy Jones Explores the Music of Henry Mancini (Mercury, 1964)
 k.d. lang, Ingénue (Sire, 1992)
 Livingston Taylor, There You Are Again (Coconut Bay, 2005)
 Jay Leonhart, Four Duke (Absolute Spain, 1995) - rec. 1994
 Arif Mardin, Journey (Atlantic, 1974) - rec. 1973
 Howard Jones, One to One (Elektra, 1986) - rec. 1985
 Steve Swallow, Swallow (Xtra Watt, 1991)
 Jon Weber, Simple Complex (2nd Century Jazz, 2004) – rec. 2003

Awards

|-
|1972
|Alone at Last
||Grammy Award for Best Jazz Performance by a Soloist
| 
|-
|1979
|Duet (with Chick Corea)
|Grammy Award for Best Jazz Instrumental Album, Individual or Group
| 
|-
|1982
|In Concert, Zürich, October 28, 1979 (with Chick Corea)
|Grammy Award for Best Jazz Instrumental Album, Individual or Group
| 
|-
|1998
|"Rhumbata", Native Sense (with Chick Corea)
|Grammy Award for Best Jazz Instrumental Solo
| 
|-
|2000
|Like Minds (with Chick Corea, Pat Metheny, Roy Haynes and Dave Holland)
|Grammy Award for Best Jazz Instrumental Album, Individual or Group
| 
|-
|2009
|The New Crystal Silence  (with Chick Corea)
|Grammy Award for Best Jazz Instrumental Performance
| 
|-
|2012
|Hot House  (with Chick Corea)
|Grammy Award for Best Improvised Jazz Solo
| 
|-
|}

See also
Vibraphone
List of vibraphonists

References

External links

 BBC's profile on Gary Burton
 Gary Burton Interview from the NAMM Oral History Library (2008)
 Gary Burton Interview from the Smithsonian Jazz Oral History Program

1943 births
Living people
American autobiographers
American jazz composers
American jazz vibraphonists
American male jazz composers
Avant-garde jazz musicians
Berklee College of Music alumni
Berklee College of Music faculty
American gay musicians
Grammy Award winners
GRP All-Star Big Band members
GRP Records artists
ECM Records artists
LGBT people from Indiana
Mack Avenue Records artists
Musicians from Anderson, Indiana
20th-century American LGBT people
21st-century American LGBT people